Jess Piasecki (born 18 April 1990) is a British long-distance runner. She competed in the senior women's race at the 2019 IAAF World Cross Country Championships held in Aarhus, Denmark. She finished in 36th place.

In 2019, she won the Ústí nad Labem Half Marathon held in Ústí nad Labem, Czech Republic. In 2019, she also won the Florence Marathon held in Florence, Italy.

Piasecki is the current female course record holder at Long Eaton parkrun.

She represented Great Britain at the 2020 Summer Olympics in Tokyo, Japan. She competed in the women's marathon at the 2020 Summer Olympics held in Tokyo, Japan.

References

External links 
 

Living people
1990 births
Place of birth missing (living people)
British female long-distance runners
British female marathon runners
British female cross country runners
Athletes (track and field) at the 2020 Summer Olympics
Olympic athletes of Great Britain
21st-century British women